Bruce Degen (born June 14, 1945) is an American illustrator and writer with over forty children's books to his credit.
He may be known best for illustrating The Magic School Bus, a picture book series written by Joanna Cole. He has collaborated with writers Nancy White Carlstrom, on the Jesse Bear books, and Jane Yolen, on the Commander Toad series. He has written and self-illustrated Jamberry, Daddy Is a Doodlebug, and Shirley's Wonderful Baby.

Life 

Degen was born and raised in Brooklyn. His youth was marked by the contrast between urban New York City and the summertimes he spent in rural upstate New York, where he would pick wild berries. He credits those experiences as the inspiration for Jamberry (1983):
"It was green. It was soft. You could walk around in bare feet, and we used to go out and pick lots of berries that grew wild. I always thought of the world as being particularly generous and joyful. And when I was searching my memories, trying to write a book for very young children about being joyful, that popped right up."

He attended elementary school in Brooklyn and went on to attend art schools in Manhattan, including LaGuardia High School and Cooper Union for his Bachelor of Fine Arts degree. He then attended Pratt Institute in Brooklyn where he obtained a Masters of Fine Arts degree with a major in printmaking and a minor in painting.

Degen lives in Connecticut with his wife, Christine Degen, and their two sons, Benjamin and Alexander Benjamin Degen is a painter. Alex Degen writes and illustrates comic books.

Career 

Degen's working life has included designing advertisements, teaching art to students, teaching children's book illustration to adults, painting scenery for opera productions, and running a lithography studio in Israel.

He was encouraged by an elementary school teacher to become an illustrator, and pursue his primary love for art found in children’s books. Humor is one of his key values, which he expressed by comparing children's illustration with the fine arts: "You don't see many people walking around a gallery are chuckling. And I realized that I wanted a chuckle."

Before creating the Magic School Bus series, he taught art and other subjects at Beach Channel High School in the Rockaway Park, Queens section of New York City, Edward R Murrow HS and at John Dewey High School in Brooklyn..

Patronage
Bruce and Christine Degen contribute "Gifts to the Garden" for the Brooklyn Botanic Gardens.

They sit as appointed members of the Newtown, Connecticut, Hattertown Historic District Commission.

Selected works

Credited authors are the writers of books illustrated by Degen.
 Aunt Possum and the Pumpkin Man (1977)
A Big Day for Scepters by Stephen Krensky (1977)
Ig Lives in a Cave by Carol Chapman (1979)
Brimhall Turns to Magic by Judy Delton (1979)
Mr. Jameson and Mr. Phillips by Marjorie Weinman Sharmat (1979)
Commander Toad series,  written by Jane Yolen (1980–1997)
My Mother Didn't Kiss Me Good-Night by Charlotte Herman (1980)
 The Little Witch and the Riddle (1980)
Little Chick's Big Day by Mary DeBall Kwitz (1981)
Dandelion Hill by Clyde Robert Bulla (1982)
Upchuck Summer by Joel L. Schwartz (1982)
Jamberry (1983)
Little Chick's Breakfast by Mary DeBall Kwitz (1983)
Daddy's Coming Home! by Lyn Littlefield Hoopes (1984)
Lonely Lula Cat by Joseph Slate (1985)
Grandpa Bear by Bonnie Pryor (1985)
Best Friends Don't Come in Threes by Joel L. Schwartz (1985)
Jesse Bear series, written by Nancy White Carlstrom (1986–2012)
The Josefina Story Quilt by Eleanor Coerr (1986)
The Good-Luck Pencil by Diane Stanley (1986)
Grandpa Bear's Christmas by Bonnie Pryor (1986)
The Magic School Bus series, written by Joanna Cole (1986–2020)
The Forgetful Bears Meet Mr. Memory by Larry Weinberg (1987)
If You Were a Writer by Joan Lowery Nixon (1988)
Tim Kitten and the Red Cupboard by Jan Wahl (1988)
The Forgetful Bears Help Santa by Larry Weinberg (1988)
Lion and Lamb by William H. Hooks and Barbara Brenner (1989)
Dinosaur Dances by Jane Yolen (1990)
Lion and Lamb Step Out by William H. Hooks and Barbara Brenner (1990)
 Teddy Bear Towers (1991)
Goblin Walk by Tony Johnston (1991)
Ups and Downs with Lion and Lamb by William H. Hooks and Barbara Brenner (1991)
Little Chick's Friend, Duckling by Mary DeBall Kwitz (1992)
Mouse's Birthday by Jane Yolen (1993)
A Beautiful Feast for a Big King Cat by John Archambault (1994)
Will You Give Me a Dream? by Joan Lowery Nixon (1994)
 Sailaway Home (1996)
Shirley's Wonderful Baby by Valiska Gregory (1999)
 Daddy Is a Doodlebug (2000) 
 I Gotta Draw (2012)
 I Said, "Bed!" (2014)
 Snow Joke (2014)
 Nate Likes to Skate (2016)

References

External links

Jamberry
Commander Toad in Space
Daddy Is a Doodlebug
Shirley's Wonderful Baby

 
 

1945 births
Living people
American children's writers
Artists from New York City
Artists from Connecticut
American children's book illustrators
People from Brooklyn